Ulises Saucedo (March 3, 1896 – November 21, 1963) was a Bolivian football coach and referee. He coached the Bolivia national team during the first FIFA World Cup in Uruguay in 1930, and also acted as  a referee during the tournament.

Of all the refereeing appointments the two that attracted most attention was that of Gilberto de Almeida Rêgo in the match between Argentina and France, in which the Brazilian referee blew up six minutes early, and Saucedo's in the Argentina and Mexico encounter, which Argentina won 6–3. During the game Saucedo awarded three penalties.

His involvement as coach was less notable, Bolivia losing both matches 4–0 to Yugoslavia and Brazil, the second of which saw both sides wearing exactly the same strip, only for Bolivia to change during a first-half stoppage.

See also
1930 FIFA World Cup

References

1896 births
1930 FIFA World Cup managers
1963 deaths
Bolivian football managers
Bolivia national football team managers
Bolivian football referees
FIFA World Cup referees
FIFA World Cup Final match officials
1930 FIFA World Cup referees